The eighth season of American Idol premiered on Tuesday, January 13, 2009, and concluded on May 20, 2009. Judges Simon Cowell, Paula Abdul, and Randy Jackson continued to judge the show's contestants, along with Ryan Seacrest as host. The season introduced Kara DioGuardi as the fourth judge on the Idol panel. It was also Abdul's final season as a judge. Kris Allen, a native of Conway, Arkansas, was announced the winner of the competition on May 20, 2009, defeating runner-up Adam Lambert after nearly 100 million votes were cast. This was the second season where both of the final two contestants had been in the bottom three or two at least once before the finale, with the first being season three.

The eighth season saw numerous changes to the format of the show. There were 36 semi-finalists instead of 24, and thirteen finalists instead of twelve, nine contestants chosen by the public and four by the judges in a wild card round. Another addition was the "save," which was used on the top seven results show to veto Matt Giraud's elimination.
 
Multiple contestants from this season were signed to record deals. This includes winner Kris Allen, who was then signed to 19 Entertainment/Jive Records, runner-up Adam Lambert, Danny Gokey, Allison Iraheta, Lil Rounds, Anoop Desai, Michael Sarver, and Mickey Guyton.

Changes from previous seasons
Several changes were planned for season eight. Fox Entertainment president Kevin Reilly stated that Idol would feature fewer "William Hung-like" contestants and "funny auditions," and would quickly move its focus to the potential singers during the earlier stages of the competition, thus moving the season at a faster pace.  Mike Darnell, president of Fox's alternative programming, said the contestants would be more emotional and that viewers would learn more about them and their pasts than they had in the previous season.
Songwriter and record producer Kara DioGuardi was added as a fourth judge on the panel. She had previously collaborated with Celine Dion, Hilary Duff, Britney Spears, Enrique Iglesias, Leona Lewis and Christina Aguilera, and produced several Top 40 hits. As a songwriter, she had already worked with several American Idol alumni and winners, including Kelly Clarkson, Carrie Underwood, David Archuleta and David Cook. Meanwhile, Ken Warwick became the new executive producer, as Nigel Lythgoe had left the show to focus on So You Think You Can Dance and his new show with Simon Fuller, Superstars of Dance.
Idol Gives Back was canceled for season 8, as the economic crisis and recession, left Idol officials uncomfortable asking financially struggling viewers to donate. The semifinals saw the biggest change as the wild card round returned for the first time since the third season. After voters picked three finalists from each of three groups of 12 semi-finalists, the judges selected eight of the previously eliminated 27 semifinalists to return and perform a song on the March 5, 2009, show. They were judged by the panel, instead of a vote by the viewers, with four advancing to the finals. Although the finals had been billed from the beginning of the season as a set of 12 contestants, the judges announced at the last minute that they would be advancing a fourth wild card/thirteenth contestant, Anoop Desai, as well. The eighth season also marked the first time that auditions were conducted outside the continental United States, when the show traveled to U.S. territory San Juan, Puerto Rico to screen potential contestants.

Judges' Save
Another change in the Idol format is judges' save, an element previously used in France's Nouvelle Star (French Idol). The judges were given the power to exercise a veto on one eliminated contestant in the finals and spare them from elimination for that particular week. This can only be invoked up until the Final 5 (Final 6 for the thirteenth, fourteenth and seventeenth seasons.)  The following week two contestants will be eliminated if the save is used because nobody is eliminated on the week that the save is used, except in eleventh and thirteenth seasons when only one contestant was eliminated. The save can only be used once per season and it must be unanimous. The new format change was revealed on March 11, 2009. The first recipient of the Judges' Save was Matt Giraud and the last when the show was on Fox was Qaasim Middleton. The twelfth season is the only season the judges' save was not used. Placings of the recipients have ranged from eighth place to runner-up. The judges' save retired after the fifteenth season, but returned in the seventeenth season (with the show airing on ABC), when the judges saved Laci Kaye Booth.

Regional auditions 
Auditions began July 17 the previous year, and were held in the following cities:

Contestants were required to be between the ages 16 and 28 on July 15, 2008, and eligible to work in the United States. Contestants were ineligible if they had previously reached the semifinal in Season 1-3 and 7, or the top 44 from season 4 and 5, or top 40 from season 6.  They were also ineligible if they held then current recording or management contracts or if they were not U.S. citizens or landed immigrants (i.e. temporary residents).

One auditioner who received widespread publicity was Katrina Darrell, also known as "Bikini Girl", for auditioning in her bikini.  She reached the Hollywood stage but was cut in the group round.

Hollywood week
For this season, the Hollywood round moved from the Orpheum Theatre to the Kodak Theatre, which was previously used for the finale in seasons 1 and 3–6. In addition, the Hollywood round was extended to two weeks.

In the first round, the 147 contestants each sang a short solo a cappella performance of any song. The next round had the remaining 107 contestants performing in groups of three or four. Group rounds had returned since season 6. The 72 contestants that passed group day performed one more solo song, this time accompanied by a band, before being narrowed down to 54. The final 54 then went to the "judges' mansion" in Los Angeles for the final results, and the Top 36 were announced. Some contestants had a sing-off to determine who would enter the top 36. Lacey Brown, who lost in a sing-off with 9th placer Megan Joy, later made the following season's Top 12 where she became the first finalist voted out.

Semifinals
The 36 contestants performed in three groups of twelve and sang songs that were Billboard Hot 100 hits. In each group, three people advanced to the next round via a public vote, while the next highest vote recipient of the remaining ten contestants in each group. Each week two males advanced however it was never revealed who was the highest voted and which advanced through the non-gender specific slot.

Color key:

Group 1

Group 2
Due to the 2009 Speech to the Joint Session of the United States Congress that held on February 24, which falls on a Tuesday, the performance show was moved to Wednesday, February 25, and results on Thursday, February 26.

Group 3

Wild Card
Following those nine singers advancing, judges pick eight of the remaining 27 semi-finalists to compete in the Wild Card round. Following another performance by each Wild Card contender, the judges selected four contestants to advance to the final group of 13.

Finalists

Kris Allen (born June 21, 1985, in Jacksonville, Arkansas, 23 years old at the time of the show) is from Conway, Arkansas and auditioned in Louisville, Kentucky with Leon Russell's "A Song For You". Allen's interest in music began at an early age; he taught himself how to play guitar at the age of 13, as well as numerous other instruments. Prior to Idol, he worked as a worship leader at New Life Church in Maumelle, Arkansas, and is a member of Chi Alpha Campus Ministries at the University of Central Arkansas, where he is a business major. Allen was announced the winner on May 20. He went on to release his first official single, "No Boundaries", which was written by Idol judge Kara DioGuardi. As a part of winning Idol, Allen was signed by Jive Records and 19 Entertainment.

Adam Lambert (born January 29, 1982, in Indianapolis, Indiana, 26 years at the time of his audition) is from San Diego, California and auditioned in San Francisco, California with Queen's "Bohemian Rhapsody". Lambert grew up in Rancho Peñasquitos, San Diego, California and attended Deer Canyon Elementary School, Mesa Verde Middle School, and Mt. Carmel High School, where he took part in theater and choir, and also performed with the school's jazz band. Lambert has been a stage actor since the age of ten, performing in such productions as You're a Good Man, Charlie Brown and Wicked.  He joined the band The Citizen Vein briefly.  He also worked as a demo singer, and those recordings were released after his appearance on Idol in the album Take One. Lambert roomed with Kris Allen during the show. Lambert was the runner-up.  He was signed to RCA Records after the show and released his debut album For Your Entertainment.

Danny Gokey (born April 24, 1980, 28 years at the time of his audition) is from Milwaukee, Wisconsin and auditioned in Kansas City, Missouri. Gokey first began singing in church with his family, and has been a worship leader for his church in Milwaukee, Faith Builders International Ministries, for several years. Four weeks before Gokey auditioned for American Idol, in July 2008, his wife Sophia underwent surgery due to congenital heart disease. She later died from complications regarding the extensive surgery. He was eliminated from the Top 3 on May 13, 2009.

Allison Iraheta (born April 27, 1992, in Glendale, California, 16 years at the time of her audition) is from Los Angeles and auditioned in San Francisco, California. Iraheta began singing at an early age, performing at small venues for her family and friends. In 2006, Iraheta won the Telemundo television series Quinceañera, where she won $50,000 and a recording contract, where only the prize money was granted. She was eliminated from the Top 4 on May 6. In making the final she became the series' youngest finalist at sixteen and turned seventeen during the Top 5 week. Her debut album, Just Like You, was released on December 1, 2009, with the single "Friday I'll Be Over U".

Matt Giraud (born May 11, 1985, in Dearborn, Michigan, 23 years at his time of the show) is from Kalamazoo, Michigan and auditioned in Louisville, Kentucky with Gavin DeGraw's "I Don't Want to Be". Giraud grew up in Ypsilanti, Michigan, where he graduated from Lincoln High School in 2003. Initially eliminated from the Top 13, Giraud was chosen by the judges to rejoin the competition during the Wild Card round.  Giraud was the lowest vote-getter during the Top 7, but was saved by the judges and eventually eliminated in Top 5.  He released an album called Perspective in 2003 and another in 2006 called Mind Body and Soul.

Anoop Desai (born December 20, 1986, in Cary, North Carolina, 22 years at the time of the show) is from Chapel Hill, North Carolina and auditioned in Kansas City, Missouri. Desai is an only child, whose father was born in India and mother was born in South Africa. He began his career as an actor for the television station WRAL-TV in Raleigh, North Carolina in a local television series entitled CentralXpress.com, and played the character "Raj". Desai attended Carnage Middle School and Phillips Middle School, then later went on to attend East Chapel Hill High School, graduating in 2004. Desai's performance as a soloist on the song "She Has No Time" was included on the 2007 iteration of the annual BOCA (Best of College A Cappella) compilation album. Desai has credited his decision to audition for American Idol to the death of a friend, Eve Carson, who was murdered. Initially eliminated from the Top 13, he was chosen by the judges to rejoin the competition during the Wild Card round.  His advancement to the finals made Idol history, making it a top 13.

Lil Rounds (born October 20, 1984, 24 years at the time of the show) is from Memphis, Tennessee and auditioned in Kansas City, Missouri with Stevie Wonder's "All I Do" . Shortly before her audition on Idol, a tornado hit Memphis, forcing Rounds to temporarily live in a motel. Her grandfather once worked with the musician B.B. King.  Her performance of Dolly Parton's "I Will Always Love You" in the Hollywood round impressed the judges; however, she failed to impress the judges in the finals and was eliminated in joint-seventh place with Anoop Desai.

Scott MacIntyre (born June 22, 1985, 23 years at the time of the show) is from Scottsdale, Arizona and auditioned in Phoenix, Arizona. MacIntyre is the first legally blind person to audition for American Idol. MacIntyre began practicing music at the age of six. Home-schooled until the age of fourteen, he later attended Arizona State University's Barrett Honors College and Herberger College of the Arts soon afterwards. In 2005, USA Today named him one of its twenty College Academic All-Stars. He obtained his master's degree at Royal Holloway, University of London and the Royal College of Music, where he studied on a Marshall Scholarship. MacIntyre produced his first CD when he was eleven, and has recorded five more CDs since then. He was accepted to both Oxford University and Cambridge University for further graduate-level education.

Megan Joy (born September 18, 1985, 23 years at the time of the show) is a single mother from Sandy, Utah and auditioned in Salt Lake City, Utah with Helen Morgan's "Can't Help Lovin' Dat Man".  Initially eliminated from the Top 13, Joy was chosen by the judges to rejoin the competition during the Wild Card round. In high school, Joy unsuccessfully tried out for numerous performance groups, including choir, and never had any singing lessons before her audition on Idol. Joy graduated from Taylorsville High School in Taylorsville, Utah in 2003. She has one son named Ryder.

Michael Sarver (born March 28, 1981, in Sulphur, Louisiana, 27 years at the time of the show) is from Jasper, Texas and auditioned in Phoenix, Arizona with Boyz II Men's "Thank You". Sarver, an oil rig worker, began singing at the age of twelve, and has written over 890 songs for himself since that time. Sarver graduated from Sulphur High School in 1998.

Alexis Grace (born August 14, 1987, 21 years at the time of the show) is from Memphis, Tennessee and auditioned in Louisville, Kentucky with Aretha Franklin's "Dr Feelgood". She gave birth to her daughter when she was nineteen. Grace began singing at an early age.  She performed Aretha Franklin's "Do Right Woman, Do Right Man" and Carrie Underwood's "Before He Cheats" in the Hollywood rounds.

Jorge Núñez (born October 1, 1987, in Cidra, Puerto Rico, 21 years at the time of the show) is from Carolina, Puerto Rico, and auditioned in San Juan, Puerto Rico. For the audition, he sang "My Way" in Spanish and Louis Armstrong's "What a Wonderful World" in English. Núñez speaks three languages fluently, English, Spanish and French. After he sang during the third semi-finals week, many people were amazed by his big voice, including Marc Anthony and Jennifer Lopez, who had stated they wanted to perform with him. He performed Jon Secada's "Angel" during the Hollywood round. Of the Top 13, Núñez was the only contestant who auditioned in Puerto Rico. He was the eliminated from the Top 13 in the first week of the finals, along with Jasmine Murray.

Jasmine Murray (born March 14, 1992, in Columbus, Mississippi, 16 years old at the time of the show) is from Starkville, Mississippi and auditioned in Jacksonville, Florida. Initially eliminated from the Top 13, Murray was chosen by the judges to rejoin the competition during the Wild Card round. In addition to competing on Idol, she competed in the Miss America's Outstanding Teen pageant in 2007. She was eliminated from the Top 13 in the first week of the finals, along with Jorge Núñez.

Finals
There are 11 weeks of finals and 13 contestants compete and at least one finalist eliminated per week based on the American public's votes. New to this series is the "Judge's save", where the judges can veto the elimination for one contestant, making the week a non-elimination, but by doing so, the week after the save is used will become a double elimination. The first week of 'Top 13' is a double elimination, making it the first season in American Idol to have two double elimination weeks in the final phase.

Color key:

Top 13 – Michael Jackson
During the first week, Alexis Grace's phone number was temporarily replaced from 1-866-IDOLS-13 to 1-866-IDOLS-36 as the former number was not owned by the program (see telephone number controversy below).

This episode reran on June 29, 2009, in a tribute to the death of Michael Jackson on June 25. To date, this became the only episode of the show to by Fox. Cowell had originally hoped for Jackson to perform on the show as part of his comeback tour.

Top 11 – Grand Ole Opry
Contestants performed songs based on the country music concert, Grand Ole Opry, for this week. Country singer Randy Travis served as the guest mentor this week.

Top 10 – Motown
Smokey Robinson served as the guest mentor this week. The show aired on a Wednesday/Thursday, March 25 and 26, as the Tuesday was pre-empted by the  White House Press Conference.

Top 9 – Popular iTunes Downloads
Contestants performed songs which they have charted high in their music streaming library iTunes.

Top 8 – Year They Were Born

Top 7 (first week) – Songs of the Cinema
Film actor/director Quentin Tarantino served as the guest mentor this week.

Top 7 (second week) – Disco

Top 5 – Rat Pack Standards
The contestants sang one song from an entertainer. Entertainer and comedian Jamie Foxx served as the guest mentor this week.

Top 4 – Rock music
For the first time this season, each contestant performed two songs: a solo and one duet with a fellow contestant. Slash served as the guest mentor this week.

Top 3 – Judges' choice and Contestants' choice
Each contestant sang two songs, each chosen by the judges and the contestant itself.

Top 2 – Contestant's choice, Simon Fuller's choice & Winner's single
Each contestant sang three songs, chosen by the contestant, the mentor Fuller, and one song for their debut single, "No Boundaries".

Elimination chart
Color key:

Other performances

Group song
Top 36/Group 1: "I'm Yours" by Jason Mraz
Top 36/Group 2: "Closer" by Ne-Yo
Top 36/Group 3: "Hot n Cold" by Katy Perry
Top 13: "I Want You Back/ABC Medley" by The Jackson 5
Top 11: "T-R-O-U-B-L-E" by Travis Tritt
Top 10: "Motown" Medley: "You Keep Me Hangin' On" by The Supremes/"You're All I Need to Get By" by Marvin Gaye and Tammi Terrell/"Ain't No Mountain High Enough" by Marvin Gaye and Tammi Terrell
Top 9: "Don't Stop Believin'" by Journey
Top 8: "Can't Get You Out of My Head" by Kylie Minogue
Top 7 (week 1): "Maniac" by Michael Sembello from Flashdance
Top 7 (week 2): "Shake Your Body (Down to the Ground)" by The Jacksons; choreographed by Paula Abdul
Top 5: "It Don't Mean a Thing (If It Ain't Got That Swing)" and "I Got Rhythm"
Top 4: "School's Out" by Alice Cooper
Top 3: The Top 3 did not perform a group routine.
Top 2: Top 13 performed "So What" by Pink and Top 2 performed Queen's "We Are The Champions" who were guest performers

Guest performances
In addition, songs are played during the elimination night to promote an artist, single, album, or the show itself. Included is a list of those songs with their Billboard Hot 100 and Hot Digital Songs reactions.

Finale
The finale took place at the Nokia Theatre on May 20, 2009.

Musical Performances:

"So What" (Pink) - Top 13

"Permanent" (David Cook) - David Cook

"Cue the Rain" (Queen Latifah) - Queen Latifah & Lil Rounds

"I'm Yours" (Jason Mraz) - Jason Mraz, Anoop Desai & Alexis Grace (the rest of the top 13 minus Kris & Adam joined at the end of the song)

"Kiss a Girl" (Keith Urban) - Keith Urban & Kris Allen

"Glamorous" (Fergie) - Top 13 girls (Alison Iraheta, Lil Rounds, Megan Joy, Alexis Grace & Jasmine Murray)

"Big Girls Don't Cry" (Fergie) - Fergie with Top 13 girls

"Boom Boom Pow" (The Black Eyed Peas) - The Black Eyed Peas

"Time After Time" (Cyndi Lauper) - Cyndi Lauper & Alison Iraheta

"Hello" (Lionel Richie) - Danny Gokey

"Just Go" (Lionel Richie) - Lionel Richie & Danny Gokey

"All Night Long" (Lionel Richie) - Lionel Richie & Danny Gokey

"Beth" (KISS) - Adam Lambert

"Detroit Rock City" (KISS) - KISS & Adam Lambert

"Rock and Roll All Night" (KISS) - KISS & Adam Lambert

"Black Magic Woman" (Santana) - Carlos Santana & Matt Giraud

"Smooth" (Santana) - Carlos Santana & Top 13

"Pretty Flowers" (Steve Martin) - Megan Joy, Michael Sarver with Steve Martin playing banjo

"Da Ya Think I'm Sexy?" (Rod Stewart) - Top 13 guys (Kris Allen, Adam Lambert, Danny Gokey, Matt Giraud, Annop Desai, Scott MacIntyre, Michael Sarver, Jorge Nunez)

"Maggie May" (Rod Stewart) - Rod Stewart

"We Are the Champions" (Queen) - Queen, Kris Allen & Adam Lambert (later joined by the rest of the top 13)

"No Boundaries" (Kris Allen) - Kris Allen

Idol Awards:

Outstanding Male - Nick Mitchell (as Norman Gentle) "And I'm Not Going" (Dreamgirls)

Best Attitude Katrina Derrel (bikini girl) "Vision of Love" with Kara DioGuardi

Outstanding Female - Tatiana Del Toro "Saving All My Love"

Controversies

Joanna Pacitti
Joanna Pacitti, who was originally selected as a semi-finalist, created controversy due to her being previously signed to A&M and Geffen Records. Later, she was found to have been having a "private relationship" with 19 Management. She was later disqualified and replaced by Felicia Barton.

Telephone number
In the Top 13, the expected phone number for contestant Alexis Grace, 1-866-IDOLS-13, was not owned by American Idol, but by a company called Intimate Encounters, who used it as a phone sex line. Although host Ryan Seacrest mentioned the replacement phone number, 1-866-IDOLS-36, several times, some commentators feared that the phone number confusion could lead to Grace being inadvertently voted off the show. However, Grace was not voted off that week.

Lip-syncing
After the Top 11 program, Justin Guarini, while hosting Idol Wrap on TV Guide channel, asserted that the show's group performances were being lip-synced. Soon after Guarini's assertion was aired, a spokesperson for the producers of American Idol said, "The Idols don't lip-sync, period." The following day, the same spokesperson said that "due to extensive choreography and to balance their voices with open mics against a screaming audience, the Idols do sing along to their own prerecorded vocal track during the group performances only." The spokesperson maintained that the performers sing their solo songs live, but their performances available to download through iTunes are recorded prior to airing.

Finale vote
Kris Allen's win over Adam Lambert resulted in controversy about the voting process, prompted by a claim that of the nearly 100 million votes cast, as many as "38 million" votes may have come from Arkansas, which was Kris's home state, despite the fact that the state only had a population of 2.86 million people at the time. Although the claim was later retracted, it resulted in allegations that AT&T may have influenced the results. Fox had previously denied these claims as baseless, stating that the network has no preference on who the winner might be. AT&T meanwhile said in a statement that the vote tally above was based on incorrect information and apologized by saying that "AT&T does not divulge or confirm how many votes were cast in any state." On May 27, 2009, the producers of the show stated that they "stand by the outcome" and are "absolutely certain" that "without a doubt Kris Allen is the American Idol."

Awards and nominations

Primetime Emmy Awards

Teen Choice Awards

U.S. Nielsen ratings 
Season eight was the top show for the 2008–09 broadcast primetime season and took the top two spots for its Tuesday and Wednesday episodes.  The viewers number for the Wednesday episodes averaged 25.527 million, while the Tuesday episodes averaged 24.741 million.  The ratings were down from season seven, with the finale dropping 13% in the 18–49 demo and 9% in total viewers number.

See also
 List of American Idol episodes: Season 8
 American Idols LIVE! Tour 2009

Notes

References

External links
American Idol Official Website
MTV's American Idol Coverage

American Idol seasons
2009 American television seasons
Television shows directed by Bruce Gowers